Gaston de Pawlowski (Joigny, 14 June 1874 - 2 February 1933, Paris) was a French writer best known for his prophetic 1911 novel of science fiction, Voyage au pays de la quatrième dimension (Voyage to the Land of the Fourth Dimension).

Voyage au pays de la quatrième dimension
First published in 1911 in the monthly review Comœdia then in 1912, Pawlowski produced a new edition in 1923 in which he discussed the implications of Einsteinian physics upon his work. That edition was published in an English translation by Brian Stableford in 2009.

The illustrations for the book edition of the Voyage were prepared by Léonard Sarluis which Jean Clair thought was the inspiration for Marcel Duchamp's Large Glass.

Selected publications
Voyage au pays de la quatrième dimension. Charpentier, Paris, 1912. (Second edition 1923)
Journey to the Land of the Fourth Dimension. English translation by Brian M. Stableford. Encino, CA: Black Coat Press, 2009.

References

External links

http://dadaparis.blogspot.co.uk/2007_03_28_archive.html
http://forums.bdfi.net/viewtopic.php?id=228

1874 births
1933 deaths
People from Joigny
French science fiction writers
Writers from Bourgogne-Franche-Comté
French male novelists